Queen's Road is a collection of roads along the northern coast of Hong Kong Island, in Hong Kong, within the limit of Victoria City. It was the first road in Hong Kong, constructed by the British between 1841 and 1843, spanning across Victoria City from Shek Tong Tsui to Wan Chai.

At various points along the route, Queen's Road marks the original shoreline before land reclamation projects permanently extended land into Victoria Harbour.

The four sections of the roads are, from west to east: Queen's Road West (Chinese: 皇后大道西), Queen's Road Central (皇后大道中), Queensway (金鐘道), and Queen's Road East (皇后大道東).

History
The road was originally 4 miles (6.5 km) long. The Royal Engineers built the first section to Sai Ying Pun with the help of 300 coolies from Kowloon (Hong Kong), then a territory of China. This section of Queen's Road ran parallel to the beach where Sir Henry Pottinger set up his tent in 1842. Originally named Main Street, it was officially renamed Queen's Road in March 1842 after Queen Victoria of the British Empire. It was mistakenly translated into Chinese as 皇后, meaning "queen consort".

When Hong Kong was founded as a British Crown Colony in 1842, Queen's Road was the hub of the island's activity. The development of this island had been haphazard: winding paths connected the Hong Kong Club for tai-pans and ran along squatter huts, military encampments and taverns. The first governors built their homes along Queen's Road; subsequently, the first post office and Christian churches soon arrived. Instead of a properly paved road, newcomers to Hong Kong found Queen's Road as a pocked dirt path that was prone to dust clouds and puddles of mud.

The Great Fire of Hong Kong 1878 
On Christmas Day 1878, a fire broke out and destroyed a large area of the slums along Queen's Road. An eyewitness account was recorded by Constance Gordon-Cumming in her 1886 book Wanderings in China. The fire raged for 17 hours and burnt down 400 houses across a  area. Thousands of residents were left homeless. Nevertheless, the devastated ruins were recycled for reclamation adjacent to the area (modern-day Bonham Strand).

After the Great Fire of 1878, Queen's Road become home to some of Hong Kong's most expensive land and famous buildings.

Roads

Queen's Road West
Queen's Road West (皇后大道西) runs from Sheung Wan to Shek Tong Tsui. It begins in Sheung Wan at the junction with Possession Street and ends where it meets the coastal road, Kennedy Town Praya.

Queen's Road Central
Queen's Road Central (皇后大道中) runs from Central to Sheung Wan. It was one of the first roads, along with Hollywood Road to be built by the British. The road became an important infrastructure to Queen's Town, which was later renamed the City of Victoria.

Queen's Road Central intersects with the similarly named Queen Victoria Street, a short street perpendicular to the road and leads to a few blocks away from the International Finance Centre.

At the western end of Queen's Road Central, the name changes to Queen's Road West. At the eastern end, it merges with Des Voeux Road Central to become Queensway at the junction of Garden Road.

When Hong Kong was occupied by the Japanese Empire from 1942 to 1945, Queen's Road Central was briefly renamed Meiji-dori, after Emperor Meiji, by the Japanese occupation government.

Queensway

Queensway was originally the westernmost section of Queen's Road East. After the development of Admiralty as a business district next to Central, this section was renamed Queensway (金鐘道) in 1967. It links Queen's Road Central to Queen's Road East and Hennessy Road.

Queen's Road East

Queen's Road East (皇后大道東) runs between Wan Chai and Happy Valley. At the western end, Queen's Road East starts at a fork junction with Queensway and Hennessy Road near Justice Drive. Although situated inland and south of five trunk routes (Gloucester Road, Jaffe Road, Lockhart Road, Hennessy Road and Johnston Road) from the Victoria Harbour, Queen's Road East runs along the old, original shoreline of Hong Kong Island.

In pop culture
Queen's Road has become an icon of the British Crown colony of Hong Kong. During the transition period before sovereignty transfer, there were rumours that all streets and roads named after the British and Commonwealth colonial figures, such as Queen's Road, would be renamed in honour of the Chinese communists. Lo Ta-yu, a local songwriter, and Albert Leung have therefore composed Queen's Road East in 1991. This song was performed by the songwriter himself and Ram Cheung Chi Kwong (蔣志光) in 1991, to describe their fear of change once the communists have taken over.
In the 1941 crime noir movie, "The Maltese Falcon", Humphrey Bogart's character (Sam Spade) looks into Mary Astor's character's (Brigid O' Shaughnessy) hat, there was a maker's label that read; "Lucille Shop – Queen's Road C Hong Kong".

See also
 List of places named after Queen Victoria
 List of streets and roads in Hong Kong

References

Central, Hong Kong
Roads on Hong Kong Island
Sai Ying Pun
Shek Tong Tsui
Sheung Wan
Wan Chai